Billy-Berclau is a commune in the Pas-de-Calais department in the Hauts-de-France region in northern France.

Geography
It is situated at the junction of the Canal de la Deûle and the Canal d'Aire. Light industry and a little farming have replaced the coal mining of the past.

History
The town was completely destroyed during World War I. On 27 March 2003, an explosion at the dynamite factory killed four people.

Population

Sights
 The church of Notre-Dame, rebuilt, as was most of the town, after World War I
 The remains of a Prévôté building (once belonging to an abbey)
 The Commonwealth War Graves Commission cemetery
 A German World War I cemetery

See also
Communes of the Pas-de-Calais department

References

External links

 Official website of Billy-Berclau 
 Website about Artois 
 The CWGC at the communal cemetery

Communes of Pas-de-Calais